Poornima University, established in 2012, is a private university in Jaipur, Rajasthan. The university was established by Rajasthan State Legislature vide Act No. 16/2012 and is recognized under section 22(1) of University Grants Commission (India) Act, 1956

Affiliations and approval 

Poornima University is approved by Council of Architecture and University of Grant Commission. The Indian Institute of Architects, Young Indians and Confederation of Indian Industry are its industrial partners.

Faculty and institutes 
 Faculty Of Engineering and Technology
 Faculty Of Computer Science & Engineering
 Faculty of Planning & Architecture
 Faculty of Design & Arts
 Faculty of Management & Commerce
 Faculty of Science & Humanities
 Faculty of Public Health
 Poornima Institute of Hotel Management
 Advanced Studies & Research Centre

Campus and facilities 

Other Facilities
The university has a ground to play cricket, football, tennis, handball, and basketball.  There is a small metrological observatory to observe the geographical and climatological phenomena, which is open for all students. Besides, 32 acres of land is dedicated to the sewerage treatment plant, and the university has also set up a 100 KW solar plant.

Research and Development
The university has set up a research and development lab. The lab also helps students publish their research papers in different national and international conferences like IEEE, CCWC, etc.

Extracurricular
Annual fest, cultural fest, and sports festivals, football league, etc., are held every year at the university. Apart from these, a three-day project exhibition is held every year at the university. Poornima University also organises different convention from time to time, last being NASA-2019.

Social Work
Poornima University runs a few social welfare programmes that offer computer literacy education and basic education to underprivileged kids in society. Poornima Pathshala is also run by Nobel Prize winner Kailash Satyarthi in the university campus.

References

External links
 

Private universities in India
Universities and colleges in Jaipur
Universities in Rajasthan
Educational institutions established in 2012
2012 establishments in Rajasthan
Educational institutions in India with year of establishment missing